The Hotplate was an Australian cooking reality television series which aired on the Nine Network on 28 July 2015. The show consisted of state-based restaurants with teams travelling the country to dine in and score each other's restaurants. The restaurants were judged by British food writer and critic, Tom Parker Bowles and Melbourne restaurateur, Scott Pickett. The show pit six established suburban restaurants against each other all striving for a leg up in the industry—and an extra $100,000 in the bank, Sydney's Guillaume Brahimi, the French-born chef,  appeared as a special guest judge during all elimination episodes.

Only one season of the program has been produced, following legal action from the Seven Network claiming the format is too similar to its own program My Kitchen Rules. Nine and Seven reached a settlement in which Nine agreed that no further seasons would be produced, and the inaugural season would never be replayed.

Format
Local restaurant heroes from around the country will do battle over dinner, they will be judged on all aspects of the restaurant experience. The worst performing teams will face elimination. The winner of the competition will receive $100,000 prize and realise their food dream.

Series overview

Elimination history

Teams

Series Details

Private Dinners

Each team has 3 hours to prep their food they are cooking. The teams and judges decide what they want to eat from their menu. Two entrees, mains and desserts are chosen. The teams score the team out of 10 for a whole score out of 50, the judges score the food and restaurant experience (separately out of 10) for a score out of 20 (score of 40 together).

Christina & Tania - Italian
 Episode 1
 Airdate — 28 July 2015

Phillipe & Pascal - French
 Episode 2
 Airdate — 29 July 2015

Aron & Vanessa - Mod Aus
 Episode 3
 Airdate — 30 July 2015

Conrad & Liam - Asian Fusion
 Episode 4
 Airdate — 3 August 2015

Marie & Emi - Japanese
 Episode 5
 Airdate — 4 August 2015

Lozz & Nols - Seafood
 Episode 6
 Airdate — 5 August 2015

1st Elimination Dinner
The 2 teams will cook 3 meals (like in the private dinners) over a 3-hour period, they must use 3 main ingredients but cooked to their style of cooking. The judges are joined by a special judge, Guillaume Brahimi, to judge the food. The over teams eat the food but do not judge it, the 2 teams are not given points but are only judge on how each meal tastes.

 Episode 7
 Airdate — 10 August 2015

Makeover Round
Each team has $20,000 each to renovate their restaurant within 72 hours. Their menus will have a makeover, they are given 3 new recipes which they have to put their food style into. They must deliver 3 dishes (same as the private dinners), each team are judged out of 100.

Aron & Vanessa

 Episode 8
 Airdate — 11 August 2015

Lozz & Nols

 Episode 9
 Airdate — 12 August 2015

Phillipe & Pascal

 Episode 10
 Airdate — 17 August 2015

Marie & Emi

 Episode 11
 Airdate — 18 August 2015

Christina & Tania

 Episode 12
 Airdate — 19 August 2015

2nd Elimination Dinner

 Episode 13
 Airdate — 24 August 2015

Finals - Public Dinners

Each team have to serve not only the other teams and judges' but also the general public, they will be judged be the general public. They will get help from their staff. Similar to the private dinners, each team will serve 2 different entrèes, mains & desserts. The eliminated teams will sit in with the public and score the overall experience. Two teams will be eliminated at the end of the round and the final two will go to the Grand Final.

Marie & Emi

 Episode 14
 Airdate — 25 August 2015

Phillipe & Pascal

 Episode 15
 Airdate — 26 August 2015

Aron & Vanessa

 Episode 16
 Airdate — 31 August 2015

Lozz & Nols

 Episode 17
 Airdate — 1 September 2015

Grand Finale
The final two teams have to cook the best dishes of their lives, four courses in four hours judged by Tom, Scott and guest judge Guillaume Brahimi who will each score out of 10. The highest scoring team will win the competition.

 Episode 18
 Airdate — 2 September 2015

Series Ratings

Ratings
 Colour key:
 Highest rating during the series  
 Lowest rating during the series  
 An elimination was held in this episode  
 Finals week

Stolen concept
On 2 August 2015, Network Seven launched a Federal Court case against Nine for plagiarism over their show My Kitchen Rules due to them "using almost identical casting, costuming, sets, music, promotion and judging processes to MKR...We believe Nine has appropriated Seven's My Kitchen Rules original format and related production elements, and contravened copyright. That's why we're in court" said a Network Seven spokesperson. The legal battle will ensue on Tuesday 4 August. This follows after tension after Nine's Reno Rumble saw contestants from The Block competing against renovators from Seven's House Rules, however no legal proceedings followed because the contestants were no longer contracted to Seven.

On 6 August 2015, the courts ruled in Nine's favour and allowed the network to air the program, with Seven expected to appeal the verdict.

Cancellation

On 19 February 2016, Seven and Nine both lodged a mutually-agreed settlement in the Federal Court, Nine agreed not to produce any further episodes and not to rebroadcast or distribute the first season across the Nine Network, both sides paid their own legal costs.

See also
My Kitchen Rules
My Restaurant Rules
MasterChef Australia
Restaurant Revolution

References 

Nine Network original programming
2015 Australian television series debuts
2015 Australian television series endings
2010s Australian reality television series
Australian cooking television series
Television shows involved in plagiarism controversies